Theile is a surname. Notable people with the surname include:

 David Theile (born 1938), Australian swimmer
 Friedrich Wilhelm Theile (1801–1879), German physician and anatomist
 Johann Theile (1646–1724), German composer of the Baroque era
 Marie-Louise Theile (born 1966), Australian news presenter

See also
 Theil